A limited express is a type of express train and express bus service. It refers to an express service that stops at a limited number of stops in comparison to other express services on the same or similar routes.

Japan 

Although some operators translate the word differently, this section is about tokubetsu kyūkō trains in Japan regardless of the translation by the operators.

There are two types of limited express trains: intercity and commuter. The former type of limited express trains generally use long-distance coaches, equipped better than other ordinary express trains, including reserved seating, dining cars or food and beverage carts, and "green cars" (first class cars). The latter type of limited express train usually incurs no surcharge, but seating is usually first-come, first-served, since this type of train uses commuter train coaches. Both types of trains travel faster and stop at fewer stations.

Presently all Shinkansen services are officially limited express, but are usually referred to as "super express" in English.

The table below summarizes the limited express on major Japanese railways (JR Group, Toei and 16 major private railways minus one major private railway that does not operate limited express, which is Tokyo Metro).

{|class=wikitable
|+Limited express on major railways in Japan
!rowspan=2|Railway
!colspan=2|Train type
!rowspan=2|Surcharge  
!rowspan=2|Picture(example)
!rowspan=2|Note
|-
!English
!Japanese
|-
|JR Group
|Limited Express
|TokkyūTsūkin Tokkyū (JR West only)
|Yes
|
|
|-
|rowspan=4|Toei
|Airport Limited Express
|Eapōto Kaitoku
|rowspan=4|No
|rowspan=4|
|rowspan=4|These services operate on the Toei Asakusa Line. Only the Airport Limited Express makes limited stops on the Toei Asakusa Line, while others stop at every station but indicate the through service into either Keisei or Keikyu Lines.
|-
|Limited Express
|Kaitoku,Kaisoku Tokkyū,Tokkyū
|-
|Access Express
|Akusesu Tokkyū
|-
|Commuter Express
|Tsūkin Tokkyū
|-
|Tobu Railway
|Limited Express
|Tokkyū
|Yes
|
|Limited express services with no surcharge on the Tobu Tojo Line were discontinued on 13 June 2008.
|-
|Seibu Railway
|Limited Express
|Tokkyū
|Yes
|
|
|-
|rowspan=3|Keisei Electric Railway
|Limited Express
|Kaisoku Tokkyū,Tokkyū|rowspan=3|No
|rowspan=3|
|rowspan=3|Skyliner, Morningliner, Eveningliner and Cityliner limited express services are classed higher than conventional limited express trains and are charged.
|-
|Access Express
|Akusesu Tokkyū|-
|Commuter Express
|Tsūkin Tokkyū|-
|rowspan=2|Keio Corporation
|Special Express
|Tokkyū|rowspan=2|No
|rowspan=2|
|rowspan=2|Keio Liner is classed higher than special express and is charged.
|-
|Semi Special Express
|Juntokkyū|-
|Odakyu Electric Railway
|Limited Express
|Tokkyū|Yes
|
|Some Romancecar limited express services operate on the Tokyo Metro network (one of the two operators of the 16 major private railways that do not offer limited express services at all).
|-
|rowspan=2|Tokyu Corporation
|Limited Express
|Tokkyū|rowspan=2|No
|rowspan=2|
|rowspan=2|S-Train services from Seibu Railway that are classed higher than Tokyu limited express services and are charged operate on the Tokyu Toyoko Line.
|-
|Commuter Limited Express(also called Commuter Express)
|Tsūkin Tokkyū|-
|rowspan=2|Keikyu Corporation
|Limited Express
|Kaitoku,Tokkyū|rowspan=2|No
|rowspan=2|
|rowspan=2|Keikyu Wing and Morning Wing services are classed higher than limited express and are charged.
|-
|Airport Limited Express
|Eapōto Kaitoku|-
|Sagami Railway
|Limited Express
|Tokkyū|No
|
|
|-
|rowspan=3|Nagoya Railroad
|μSKY
|Myū-Sukai|Yes
|rowspan=3|
|Trains consist of first class cars (charged) only.
|-
|Rapid Limited Express
|Kaisoku Tokkyū|rowspan=2|Some trains
|rowspan=2|Some trains consist of regular cars only.
|-
|Limited Express
|Tokkyū|-
|Kintetsu Railway
|Limited Express
|Tokkyū|Yes
|
|
|-
|Nankai Electric Railway
|Limited Express
|Tokkyū|Some trains
|
|Rapi:t, Koya, Rinkan,and Senboku Liner services consist of reserved seat cars (charged) only.
|-
|rowspan=2|Keihan Electric Railway
|Limited Express
|Tokkyū,Kaisoku Tokkyū|Yes
|rowspan=2|
|rowspan=2|Starting August 2017 one first class car (called Premium car) is present on all Limited Express services
|-
|Liner
|Liner|Yes
|-
|rowspan=4|Hankyu Corporation
|Limited Express
|Tokkyū|rowspan=4|No
|rowspan=4|
|rowspan=4|
|-
|Commuter Limited Express
|Tsūkin Tokkyū|-
|Rapid Limited Express
|Kaisoku Tokkyū|-
|Rapid Limited Express A
|Kaisoku Tokkyū A|-
|Hanshin Electric Railway
|Limited Express
|Tokkyū,Chokutsū Tokkyū,Kukan Tokkyū, 
|No
|
|
|-
|Nishi-Nippon Railroad
|Limited Express
|Tokkyū|No
|
|
|}

 Australia 
In Australia, particularly in Melbourne, selective commuter trains often skip smaller stations during peak hours, primarily for the purpose of more efficient delivery of passengers to interchange stations or higher-patronage stations.  In Brisbane and Sydney, limited stop services are formed by commuter trains that run as limited stops or express services from the city centre to the edge of the suburban area and then as all stops in the interurban area (an example of such an express pattern can be seen on the Gold Coast line).

 New Zealand 
In the era of steam-hauled provincial expresses, limited express services were common on highly trafficked routes. The Night Limited was the premier express train on the North Island Main Trunk Railway between Auckland and Wellington from 1924 until 1971; during peak seasons, it was augmented by the Daylight Limited. Following the Night Limited was a slower unnamed express that stopped at more stations and provided a lower level of comfort.

A different pattern was employed on the Main South Line. The South Island Limited express ran three days a week from Christchurch through Dunedin to Invercargill, with a slower regular express operating on the other four days. Both regular and limited expresses were augmented by additional services between intermediate destinations, such as an evening railcar between Christchurch and Dunedin operated by the 88 seater or Vulcan classes.

Limited expresses were rare beyond the main trunk routes and the regular provincial expresses were typically augmented with even slower mixed trains. However, when the Rotorua Express schedule was accelerated in 1930 and its carriages upgraded, it was rebranded as the Rotorua Limited. Due to the Great Depression and rising car ownership levels, it did not achieve the level of success intended, thus in 1937 it reverted to the status and service pattern of a regular express.

After the demise of the Night Limited and the South Island Limited in 1971, the term "limited express" fell into disuse in New Zealand and has not been applied to any subsequent trains. However, from 1971 to 1979, the Silver Star performed the role of a limited express as it operated to a faster schedule than a supplementary slower service that was known from 1975 as the Northerner.

, Auckland Transport introduced limited express services on the Onehunga Line. These services operate until 7:30 PM on weekdays, bypassing Parnell, Remuera and Greenlane stations.

Philippines
There were trains under the Manila Railroad Company and the Philippine National Railways that were called "Limited Express" or simply "Limited", as well as Special and Express trains that nonetheless stopped at fewer stations. The first of such services were introduced in the 1950s and peaked in the 1970s. They only stop at major stations along the two intercity main lines in Luzon unlike regular expresses. They were given the highest priority, dedicated rolling stock, and the highest level of comfort and amenities.

The North Main Line had the Ilocos Special and the Amianan Night Express that ran between 1973 and 1984, then the fastest services in the PNR and stopped at fewer stations compared to the Dagupan Express. Meanwhile, the second Bicol Express, opened in 1954, only stopped at 8 out of 66 stations of the line between Tutuban station in downtown Manila and Legazpi station in Albay. Other examples on the South Main Line include the Peñafrancia Express, the Isarog/Manila Limited, and the Mayon Limited, all of these were defunct by 2013 when all intercity rail was discontinued in favor of building a new line.

There are plans to revive the "limited express" trains. The North–South Commuter Railway and the new South Main Line under the South Long Haul project will both feature "limited express" services. For the North–South Commuter Railway (NSCR), an airport express train will connect Clark International Airport with Alabang station in Muntinlupa, skipping all the other stations in Central Luzon and only stopping at four other stations in Metro Manila. In comparison, the "Commuter Express" services on the NSCR will serve more stations but will use the same electric multiple units as the regular commuter service.

To the south of the NSCR, the Bicol Express flagship service of the PNR South Long Haul was originally proposed as a limited express service in 2018. However, a new basic design report released on June 2021 reclassified the services into two groups: Local and Express. The new Bicol Express service has since been relegated to a regular express train service.

United States
Some of the most elite trains in the United States in the twentieth century were called "limited", a name that typically graced overnight trains that made very few stops. (However, the fastest train between New York and Washington, DC, a day train, in the Pennsylvania Railroad era was called the Congressional Limited Express, and it had few stops, like the longer distance "Limiteds".)

Some limiteds of America have included: 
the Chicago, Milwaukee & St Paul Railway’s Pioneer Limited - one of the first and longest running named trains in the country 
the New York Central Railroad's 20th Century Limited and its Amtrak successor, the Lake Shore Limited 
the Pennsylvania Railroad's (and later, Amtrak) Broadway Limited 
the New Haven's (and later, Amtrak) Merchants Limitedthe Baltimore and Ohio Railroad's National Limitedthe Rock Island Rail Road's and the Southern Pacific Railroad's Golden State Limitedthe Santa Fe Railroad's Super Chiefthe Union Pacific Railroad's City of Los Angelesthe Southern Pacific Railroad's Sunset Limited
The B and O Railroad's Capitol Limited

From September 23, 1978, to April 15, 1990, the New York City Subway operated a limited express premium-fare subway service from Manhattan to JFK, which was called the JFK Express. The subway service made express stops at subway stations in Manhattan and one subway station in Brooklyn, before running nonstop to Howard Beach-JFK Airport, where transfers to free airport shuttle buses were provided. The JFK Express proved to be unsuccessful, seeing low ridership in part because the service did not actually serve any airline terminals.

Some commuter railroads operate express trains making limited stops. The Long Island Rail Road operates some rush hour trains that run 50 miles between the central city station and the first stop of its express route itinerary, for instance, on the Ronkonkoma Line. The Metro-North Railroad runs some rush hour trains that run 29 miles between the central city and the first stop of their route itinerary on the Hudson Line and the New Haven Line.

Due to the wide availability of service on the Northeast Regional and Acela Express, most of Amtrak's medium- and long-distance trains operating along the Northeast Corridor only stop to discharge passengers from Washington Union Station (or in some cases, Alexandria Union Station) northward, and to receive passengers from Newark Penn Station southward.

 South Korea 
The term "Limited Express" is 특급 (特急, Teukgeup) in Korean. Limited express trains stop at fewer stations than regular express trains (급행, 急行, Geuphaeng'').

Indonesia 

The Sriwijaya train (or also known as the Sriwijaya Limited Express (Limex) train, which means the Sriwijaya Limited Express (Patas) train) is a passenger train service operated by PT Kereta Api Indonesia to serve the Palembang Kertapati-Tanjungkarang line and vice versa.

See also 
 Limited-stop

References 

 Japan Railways Group - Train and seat types

Passenger rail transport